The Andafiavaratra Palace, located on the highest hilltop of the capital city of Antananarivo, was the residence of Prime Minister Rainilaiarivony of Madagascar, who governed the island kingdom in the late 19th century. The building currently serves as a museum and the estimated 1,466 objects of historical importance to the Kingdom of Madagascar that were rescued from the 1995 fire at the Rova of Antananarivo are housed here.

References

Buildings and structures in Antananarivo
Palaces in Madagascar
Museums in Madagascar